Nordenskiöld Bay is a bay on the northern coast of Nordaustlandet, Svalbard.

The bay is named after Arctic explorer Adolf Erik Nordenskiöld.

Geography
Located between Laponiahalvøya and Prins Oscars Land, the bay is facing north and has a width of about 25 nautical miles. 
It contains several fjords and smaller bays, including Ekstremfjorden, Sabinebukta, Carolusbukta and Rijpfjorden.

References

Bays of Svalbard
Nordaustlandet